Haberlandia ueleensis is a moth in the family Cossidae. It is found in the Democratic Republic of the Congo. The habitat consists of forests.

The wingspan is about 16.5 mm. The forewings are warm buff with buffy-olive lines and striae. The hindwings are warm buff with a reticulated (net-like) ecru-olive pattern.

Etymology
The species is named for the Uele provinces Bas-Uele and Haut-Uele.

References

Natural History Museum Lepidoptera generic names catalog

Moths described in 2011
Metarbelinae
Taxa named by Ingo Lehmann
Endemic fauna of the Democratic Republic of the Congo